Chris Horsman (born 2 February 1978) is a former Wales international rugby union player.

Club career
Horsman attended Sheldon School in Chippenham, Wiltshire and represented England at youth international level.

Horsman started his club career at Bath in 1997 before joining Bridgend in 2002. With the advent of regional rugby in Wales, Horsman was called up to the Celtic Warriors regional side, but when the club was disbanded due to financial difficulties in 2004 he was forced to seek another club.

Horsman signed for Worcester in July 2004 and established himself as one of the best props in the English game. He signed a contract extension at the beginning of 2006 to keep him at Sixways until the summer of 2010 but in July 2009 he announced his retirement after a series of injuries.

International career
He was offered a place in the England national rugby union team, but two separate bouts with cancer prevented him from playing for England. However, he later chose to play for Wales as he qualified through the three-year international residency rule.

Horsman made his full Welsh debut on 11 November 2005 against Fiji at the Millennium Stadium. He scored his first and only try against England at the Millennium Stadium on 17 March 2007 and he was selected for the Wales squad for the 2007 Rugby World Cup. He attained a total of 14 international caps for Wales.

Refereeing and coaching

Following his retirement as a player, he announced his intentions to begin training as a referee.

Horsman has also pursued a coaching career within the Welsh setup, as head coach of RGC 1404 from 2012 to 2014, and subsequent appointments within Wales' age-grade teams. In 2018, Horsman coached the Wales national under-20 rugby union team.

Personal life
In 1997, Horsman was diagnosed with testicular cancer, which was successfully treated at the Royal Marsden hospital in Sutton, London; only for him to be later diagnosed with a strain of lymphatic cancer. The second occurrence of this cancer was also treated successfully and Horsman returned to rugby.

References

External links
 Welsh Rugby Profile on WRU.co.uk
 Worcester Warriors Profile at Warriors.co.uk
 Guinness Premiership Profile at GuinnessPremiership.com

1977 births
Living people
Rugby union props
English rugby union coaches
English rugby union players
Wales international rugby union players
Bath Rugby players
Worcester Warriors players
Bridgend RFC players
People from Newport Pagnell
People educated at Sheldon School
Rugby union players from Buckinghamshire